The 2019 Uzbekistan Super League (known as the Coca-Cola Uzbekistan Super League for sponsorship reasons) will be the 28th season of top-level football in Uzbekistan since its establishment on 1992. Lokomotiv Tashkent are the defending champions from the 2018 campaign.

Teams

 1 On the back of the strip.

Managerial changes

Foreign players

The number of foreign players is restricted to five per USL team. A team can use only five foreign players on the field in each game.

In bold: Players that have been capped for their national team.

League table

Positions by round

Results

Results by match played

Goals
.

Goalscorers

Hat-tricks

Attendances

By round

By team

Awards

Monthly awards

Annual awards 
The awards of 2019 Uzbekistan Super League were announced on 24 December 2019.

References

Uzbekistan
Uzbekistan Super League seasons
2019 in Uzbekistani football